Below are the results for the 2013 World Series of Poker.

Key

Results

Event #1: $500 Casino Employees No Limit Hold'em

 2-Day Event: May 29-30
 Number of Entries: 898
 Total Prize Pool: $404,100
 Number of Payouts: 90
 Winning Hand:

Event #2: $5,000 No Limit Hold'em Eight Handed

 4-Day Event: May 29-June 1
 Number of Entries: 481
 Total Prize Pool: $2,260,700
 Number of Payouts: 56
 Winning Hand:

Event #3: $1,000 No Limit Hold'em Re-entry

 3-Day Event: May 30-June 1
 Number of Entries: 3,164
 Total Prize Pool: $2,847,600
 Number of Payouts: 324
 Winning Hand:

Event #4: $1,500 No Limit Hold'em Six Handed

 3-Day Event: May 31-June 2
 Number of Entries: 1,069
 Total Prize Pool: $1,443,150
 Number of Payouts: 108
 Winning Hand:

Event #5: $2,500 Omaha/Seven Card Stud Hi-Low 8-or Better

 3-Day Event: May 31-June 2
 Number of Entries: 374
 Total Prize Pool: $850,850
 Number of Payouts: 40
 Winning Hand:  X

Event #6: $1,500 Millionaire Maker No Limit Hold'em

 4-Day Event: June 1-4
 Number of Entries: 6,343
 Total Prize Pool: $8,563,050
 Number of Payouts: 648
 Winning Hand:

Event #7: $1,000 No Limit Hold'em

 3-Day Event: June 2-4
 Number of Entries: 1,837
 Total Prize Pool: $1,653,300
 Number of Payouts: 198
 Winning Hand:

Event #8: $2,500 Eight Game Mix

 3-Day Event: June 2-4
 Number of Entries: 388
 Total Prize Pool: $882,700
 Number of Payouts: 40
 Winning Hand:  (Pot Limit Omaha)

Event #9: $3,000 No Limit Hold'em Shootout

 3-Day Event: June 3-5
 Number of Entries: 477
 Total Prize Pool: $1,302,210
 Number of Payouts: 60
 Winning Hand:

Event #10: $1,500 Limit Hold'em

 3-Day Event: June 3-5
 Number of Entries: 645
 Total Prize Pool: $870,750
 Number of Payouts: 72
 Winning Hand:

Event #11: $2,500 No Limit Hold'em Six Handed

 3-Day Event: June 4-6
 Number of Entries: 924
 Total Prize Pool: $2,102,100
 Number of Payouts: 108
 Winning Hand:

Event #12: $1,500 Pot Limit Hold'em

 3-Day Event: June 5-7
 Number of Entries: 535
 Total Prize Pool: $722,250
 Number of Payouts: 54
 Winning Hand:

Event #13: $5,000 Seven Card Stud Hi-Low Split-8 or Better

 3-Day Event: June 5-7
 Number of Entries: 210
 Total Prize Pool: $987,000
 Number of Payouts: 24
 Winning Hand:

Event #14: $1,500 No Limit Hold'em

 3-Day Event: June 6-8
 Number of Entries: 1,819
 Total Prize Pool: $2,455,650
 Number of Payouts: 198
 Winning Hand:

Event #15: $1,500 H.O.R.S.E.

 3-Day Event: June 7-9
 Number of Entries: 862
 Total Prize Pool: $1,163,700
 Number of Payouts: 96
 Winning Hand:  (Razz)

Event #16: $10,000 Heads Up No Limit Hold'em

 3-Day Event: June 7-9
 Number of Entries: 162
 Total Prize Pool: $1,522,800
 Number of Payouts: 16
 Winning Hand:

Event #17: $1,500 No Limit Hold'em

 3-Day Event: June 8-10
 Number of Entries: 2,105
 Total Prize Pool: $2,841,750
 Number of Payouts: 216
 Winning Hand:

Event #18: $1,000 No Limit Hold'em

 3-Day Event: June 9-11
 Number of Entries: 2,071
 Total Prize Pool: $1,863,900
 Number of Payouts: 216
 Winning Hand:

Event #19: $5,000 Pot Limit Hold'em

 3-Day Event: June 9-11
 Number of Entries: 195
 Total Prize Pool: $916,500
 Number of Payouts: 27
 Winning Hand:

Event #20: $1,500 Omaha Hi-Low Split-8 or Better

 4-Day Event: June 10-13
 Number of Entries: 1,014
 Total Prize Pool: $1,368,900
 Number of Payouts: 117
 Winning Hand:

Event #21: $3,000 No Limit Hold'em Six Handed

 3-Day Event: June 11-13
 Number of Entries: 807
 Total Prize Pool: $2,205,840
 Number of Payouts: 90
 Winning Hand:

Event #22: $1,500 Pot Limit Omaha

 3-Day Event: June 12-14
 Number of Entries: 1,022
 Total Prize Pool: $1,378,350
 Number of Payouts: 117
 Winning Hand:

Event #23: $2,500 Seven Card Stud

 3-Day Event: June 12-14
 Number of Entries: 246
 Total Prize Pool: $559,650
 Number of Payouts: 32
 Winning Hand:

Event #24: $1,500 No Limit Hold'em

 3-Day Event: June 13-15
 Number of Entries: 1,731
 Total Prize Pool: $2,336,850
 Number of Payouts: 198
 Winning Hand:

Event #25: $5,000 Omaha Hi-Low Split-8 or Better

 3-Day Event: June 13-15
 Number of Entries: 241
 Total Prize Pool: $1,132,700
 Number of Payouts: 27
 Winning Hand:

Event #26: $1,000 Seniors No Limit Hold'em Championship

 3-Day Event: June 14-16
 Number of Entries: 4,407
 Total Prize Pool: $3,966,300
 Number of Payouts: 441
 Winning Hand:

Event #27: $3,000 Mixed Max No Limit Hold'em

 4-Day Event: June 14-17
 Number of Entries: 593
 Total Prize Pool: $1,618,890
 Number of Payouts: 68
 Winning Hand:

Event #28: $1,500 No Limit Hold'em

 3-Day Event: June 15-17
 Number of Entries: 2,115
 Total Prize Pool: $2,855,250
 Number of Payouts: 216
 Winning Hand:

Event #29: $5,000 H.O.R.S.E.

 4-Day Event: June 15-18
 Number of Entries: 261
 Total Prize Pool: $1,226,700
 Number of Payouts: 32
 Winning Hand:  (Hold'em)

Event #30: $1,000 No Limit Hold'em

 3-Day Event: June 16-18
 Number of Entries: 2,108
 Total Prize Pool: $1,897,200
 Number of Payouts: 216
 Winning Hand:

Event #31: $1,500 Pot Limit Omaha Hi-Low Split-8 or Better

 3-Day Event: June 17-19
 Number of Entries: 936
 Total Prize Pool: $1,263,600
 Number of Payouts: 117
 Winning Hand:

Event #32: $5,000 No Limit Hold'em Six Handed

 3-Day Event: June 18-20
 Number of Entries: 516
 Total Prize Pool: $2,425,200
 Number of Payouts: 54
 Winning Hand:

Event #33: $2,500 Seven Card Razz

 3-Day Event: June 18-20
 Number of Entries: 301
 Total Prize Pool: $684,775
 Number of Payouts: 32
 Winning Hand: A-3-4-4-6-10-8

Event #34: $1,000 Turbo No Limit Hold'em

 2-Day Event: June 19-20
 Number of Entries: 1,629
 Total Prize Pool: $1,466,100
 Number of Payouts: 171
 Winning Hand:

Event #35: $3,000 Pot Limit Omaha

 3-Day Event: June 19-21
 Number of Entries: 640
 Total Prize Pool: $1,747,200
 Number of Payouts: 72
 Winning Hand:

Event #36: $1,500 No Limit Hold'em Shootout

 3-Day Event: June 20-22
 Number of Entries: 1,194
 Total Prize Pool: $1,611,900
 Number of Payouts: 120
 Winning Hand:

Event #37: $5,000 Limit Hold'em

 3-Day Event: June 20-22
 Number of Entries: 170
 Total Prize Pool: $799,000
 Number of Payouts: 18
 Winning Hand:

Event #38: $2,500 No Limit Hold'em Four Handed

 3-Day Event: June 21-23
 Number of Entries: 566
 Total Prize Pool: $1,287,650
 Number of Payouts: 64
 Winning Hand:

Event #39: $1,500 Seven Card Stud Hi-Low-8 or Better

 3-Day Event: June 21-23
 Number of Entries: 558
 Total Prize Pool: $753,300
 Number of Payouts: 56
 Winning Hand:

Event #40: $1,500 No Limit Hold'em

 3-Day Event: June 22-24
 Number of Entries: 2,161
 Total Prize Pool: $2,917,350
 Number of Payouts: 243
 Winning Hand:

Event #41: $5,000 Pot Limit Omaha Six Handed

 3-Day Event: June 22-24
 Number of Entries: 400
 Total Prize Pool: $1,880,000
 Number of Payouts: 42
 Winning Hand:

Event #42: $1,000 No Limit Hold'em

 3-Day Event: June 23-25
 Number of Entries: 2,100
 Total Prize Pool: $1,890,000
 Number of Payouts: 216
 Winning Hand:

Event #43: $10,000 2-7 Draw Lowball (No Limit)

 3-Day Event: June 23-25
 Number of Entries: 87
 Total Prize Pool: $817,800
 Number of Payouts: 14
 Winning Hand: 10-8-7-3-2

Event #44: $3,000 No Limit Hold'em

 3-Day Event: June 24-26
 Number of Entries: 1,072
 Total Prize Pool: $2,926,560
 Number of Payouts: 117
 Winning Hand:

Event #45: $1,500 Ante Only No Limit Hold'em

 3-Day Event: June 25-27
 Number of Entries: 678
 Total Prize Pool: $915,300
 Number of Payouts: 72
 Winning Hand:

Event #46: $3,000 Pot Limit Omaha Hi-Low Split-8 or Better

 3-Day Event: June 25-27
 Number of Entries: 435
 Total Prize Pool: $1,187,550
 Number of Payouts: 45
 Winning Hand:

Event #47: $111,111 One Drop High Rollers No Limit Hold'em

 4-Day Event: June 26-29
 Number of Entries: 166
 Total Prize Pool: $17,891,148
 Number of Payouts: 24
 Winning Hand:

Event #48: $2,500 Limit Hold'em Six Handed

 3-Day Event: June 26-28
 Number of Entries: 343
 Total Prize Pool: $780,325
 Number of Payouts: 36
 Winning Hand:

Event #49: $1,500 No Limit Hold'em

 3-Day Event: June 27-29
 Number of Entries: 2,247
 Total Prize Pool: $3,033,450
 Number of Payouts: 243
 Winning Hand:

Event #50: $2,500 10-Game Mix Six Handed

 3-Day Event: June 27-29
 Number of Entries: 372
 Total Prize Pool: $846,300
 Number of Payouts: 42
 Winning Hand:

Event #51: $1,000 Ladies No Limit Hold'em Championship

 3-Day Event: June 28-30
 Number of Entries: 954
 Total Prize Pool: $858,600
 Number of Payouts: 117
 Winning Hand:

Event #52: $25,000 No Limit Hold'em Six Handed

 3-Day Event: June 28-30
 Number of Entries: 175
 Total Prize Pool: $4,156,250
 Number of Payouts: 18
 Winning Hand:

Event #53: $1,500 No Limit Hold'em

 4-Day Event: June 29-July 2
 Number of Entries: 2,816
 Total Prize Pool: $3,801,600
 Number of Payouts: 297
 Winning Hand:

Event #54: $1,000 No Limit Hold'em

 3-Day Event: June 30-July 2
 Number of Entries: 2,883
 Total Prize Pool: $2,594,700
 Number of Payouts: 297
 Winning Hand:

Event #55: $50,000 The Poker Players Championship

 5-Day Event: June 30-July 4
 Number of Entries: 132
 Total Prize Pool: $6,336,000
 Number of Payouts: 16
 Winning Hand:  (Limit Hold'em)

Event #56: $2,500 No Limit Hold'em

 4-Day Event: July 1-4
 Number of Entries: 1,736
 Total Prize Pool: $3,949,400
 Number of Payouts: 198
 Winning Hand:

Event #57: $5,000 No Limit Hold'em

 4-Day Event: July 2-5
 Number of Entries: 784
 Total Prize Pool: $3,684,800
 Number of Payouts: 81
 Winning Hand:

Event #58: $1,111 The Little One for One Drop No Limit Hold'em

 5-Day Event: July 3-7
 Number of Entries: 4,756
 Total Prize Pool: $4,280,400
 Number of Payouts: 495
 Winning Hand:

Event #59: $2,500 2-7 Triple Draw Lowball (Limit)

 3-Day Event: July 3-5
 Number of Entries: 282
 Total Prize Pool: $641,550
 Number of Payouts: 30
 Winning Hand: 9-8-6-5-2

Event #60: $1,500 No Limit Hold'em

 3-Day Event: July 5-7
 Number of Entries: 2,541
 Total Prize Pool: $3,430,350
 Number of Payouts: 270
 Winning Hand:

Event #61: $10,000 Pot Limit Omaha

 3-Day Event: July 5-7
 Number of Entries: 386
 Total Prize Pool: $3,628,400
 Number of Payouts: 45
 Winning Hand:

Event #62: $10,000 No Limit Hold'em Main Event

 10-Day Event: July 6-15
 Final Table: November 4-5
 Number of Entries: 6,352
 Total Prize Pool: $59,708,800
 Number of Payouts: 648
 Winning Hand:

Notes

World Series of Poker
World Series of Poker Results, 2013